Hermannus Höfte (5 August 1884 in Amsterdam – 18 November 1961 in Amsterdam) was a Dutch rower.

After a four months training period, he competed in the 1908 Summer Olympics in the coxless four event. He and the other of the team were a member of “de Amstel” and trained by Ooms. He was the bowman of the Dutch boat, which won the bronze medal in the coxless fours.

References

External links
profile

1884 births
1961 deaths
Dutch male rowers
Olympic rowers of the Netherlands
Rowers at the 1908 Summer Olympics
Olympic bronze medalists for the Netherlands
Rowers from Amsterdam
Olympic medalists in rowing
Medalists at the 1908 Summer Olympics
20th-century Dutch people